Facundo Echevarría (born 31 July 2002) is an Argentine professional footballer who plays as a forward for Defensa y Justicia.

Career
Echevarría joined the youth ranks of Defensa y Justicia from hometown side Club Atlético Carcarañá. He made the breakthrough into manager Hernán Crespo's first-team squad in December 2020, initially appearing on the bench for a Copa de la Liga Profesional win on the road against Unión Santa Fe. Echevarría's senior debut arrived in the aforementioned competition on 2 January 2021 during a fixture with Rosario Central, as he replaced Nicolás Leguizamón off the bench in a 3–0 defeat away from home.

Career statistics
.

Notes

References

External links

2002 births
Living people
People from San Lorenzo Department
Argentine footballers
Association football forwards
Argentine Primera División players
Defensa y Justicia footballers
Sportspeople from Santa Fe Province